The Social Security Fairness Act is a proposed United States law that would repeal the Social Security Government Pension Offset and Windfall Elimination Provision.

Background

Provisions

Legislative history 
As of October  7, 2022:

See also 

List of bills in the 113th United States Congress
List of bills in the 114th United States Congress
List of bills in the 115th United States Congress
 List of bills in the 116th United States Congress
 List of bills in the 117th United States Congress

References

External links 

 H.R. 82: Social Security Fairness Act on GovTrack
 S. 1302: Social Security Fairness Act on GovTrack

Proposed legislation of the 117th United States Congress
United States federal welfare and public assistance legislation